In the Slot is a Tower of Power album released in 1975. It was their last studio album for Warner Bros. Records.  It also marked the debut of new vocalist Hubert Tubbs. David Garibaldi returns to the drummer's throne after being absent from the previous album Urban Renewal (save for one track), although the drummer from that album, David Bartlett, does appear as a background vocalist on this album, as does Garibaldi's next successor, Ron Beck. "Ebony Jam" and "Drop It in the Slot" were sampled on the Beastie Boys' 1989 album Paul's Boutique.

Track listing
LP side one
 "Just Enough and Too Much" (Emilio Castillo, Stephen Kupka, Frank Biner) - 3:25
 "Treat Me Like Your Man" (Lenny Williams, Emilio Castillo, Stephen "Doc" Kupka) - 3:08
 "If I Play My Cards Right" (Frank Biner, Stephen "Doc" Kupka, Emilio Castillo) - 3:14
 "As Surely as I Stand Here" (Stephen "Doc" Kupka, Chester Thompson, Emilio Castillo) - 5:17
 "Fanfare: Matanuska" (Greg Adams) - 0:16
 "On the Serious Side" (Emilio Castillo, Stephen "Doc" Kupka) - 2:54
LP side two
 "Ebony Jam" (Chester Thompson) - 6:45
 "You're So Wonderful, So Marvelous" (Frank Biner, Stephen "Doc" Kupka, Emilio Castillo) - 3:13
 "Vuela Por Noche" (David Garibaldi, Bruce Conte, Greg Adams, Francis Rocco Prestia) - 1:34
 "Essence of Innocence" (Chester Thompson) - 0:35
 "The Soul of a Child" (Stephen "Doc" Kupka, Bruce Conte, Emilio Castillo) - 4:56
 "Drop It in the Slot" (Emilio Castillo, Stephen "Doc" Kupka) - 3:12

Personnel 
Tower of Power
 Hubert Tubbs – lead vocals
 Chester Thompson – acoustic piano, clavinet, organ, ARP String Ensemble, bass pedals, backing vocals, arrangements (1, 4, 7, 10)
 Bruce Conte – guitars, backing vocals
 Francis Rocco Prestia – bass guitar
 David Garibaldi – drums
 Lenny Pickett – alto saxophone, soprano saxophone, 1st tenor saxophone, all sax solos, clarinet, contrabass clarinet, flute, piccolo flute, Lyricon
 Stephen "Doc" Kupka – baritone saxophone
 Emilio Castillo – 2nd tenor saxophone, backing vocals, co-lead vocals (8)
 Mic Gillette – trombone, bass trombone, trumpet, piccolo trumpet, flugelhorn, backing vocals
 Greg Adams – trumpet, flugelhorn, arrangements (2, 3, 5, 6-9, 11, 12), flugelhorn solo (7), trumpet solo (9), string arrangements and conductor
 Tower of Power – arrangements (1, 3, 6, 12)

Additional backing vocals
 Bootche Anderson, David Bartlett, Ron E. Beck, Frank Biner, Roger Rifkind, Marilyn Scott and Pepper Watkins

Production 
 Emilio Castillo – producer 
 Tower of Power – producers
 Alan Chinowsky – engineer 
 Tom Flye – engineer 
 Chris Morris – assistant engineer 
 Bruce Steinberg – album design, photography
 Ellie Oberzil – design assistant 
 Recorded and Mixed at Record Plant (Sausalito, CA)
 B&B Novelty Corp. (San Francisco, CA) – pinball consultants

Sources
http://www.discogs.com/release/575680

1975 albums
Tower of Power albums
Warner Records albums